Dichomeris semnias is a moth in the family Gelechiidae. It was described by Edward Meyrick in 1926. It is found in north-eastern India.

The forewings are slaty fuscous suffusedly irrorated (sprinkled) with darker and with the anterior half of the costa dark fuscous with about eight ochreous-whitish dots. The stigmata are minute, grey whitish, the plical rather obliquely before the first discal. The hindwings are grey.

References

Moths described in 1926
semnias